Mode. Set. Clear. is the debut album by New Zealand alternative rock band Villainy, released in New Zealand on October 19, 2012, and distributed by Universal Records. The album received the award for Best Rock Album at the 2013 New Zealand Music Awards.

Track listing

Personnel 
Adapted from the liner notes.

Villainy
 Neill Fraser – guitar, vocals, piano
 Dave Johnston – drums, percussion
 Thomas Watts – guitar
 James Dylan – bass

Production
 Tom Larkin – producer, mixing, recording, drums and percussion ("Paradise Lost)
 Ben Ehrenberg – engineer, additional production
 Jordan Stone – assistant engineer (Auckland)
 Ben Ehrenberg – mixing ("Monday Night Fright Night")
 Dave Johnston – additional recording (Auckland)
 Matt Keller – additional recording (Auckland)
 Luke Benge – upright piano ("Another Time" and "More Than You Can Do")
 John Ruberto – mastering
 Storm Thorgerson – cover design and photography
 Peter Curzon – cover design and photography
 Lee Baker – cover design and photography

Charts

References 

2012 debut albums
Villainy (band) albums
Albums produced by Tom Larkin
Albums with cover art by Storm Thorgerson
Albums recorded at Roundhead Studios